Văliug is a commune in Caraș-Severin County, western Romania, with a population of 741 people. It is composed of a single village, Văliug.

References

Communes in Caraș-Severin County
Localities in Romanian Banat